David H. Douglass (born 1932) is an American physicist at the University of Rochester.

Background

Climate change 

A 2005 study by Douglass and fellow University of Rochester physicist Robert S. Knox argued that global climate models underestimated the climate response to the 1991 eruption of Mount Pinatubo. The study also contended that global temperature returned to normal much faster after the eruption than the models had predicted.

A 2007 paper by Douglass and coworkers questioned the reliability of 22 of the most commonly used global climate models analyzed by Benjamin D. Santer and used by the IPCC to predict accelerated warming in the troposphere. The study had originally been submitted to Geophysical Research Letters the previous year, but was rejected in September 2006 on Santer's recommendation. Santer and 17 co-authors later rebutted Douglass' paper.

Douglass was named a fellow of Alfred P. Sloan Foundation in 1963 and elected a fellow of the American Physical Society in 1969. He is a Fellow of the New York Academy of Sciences.

References

External links

Home page
Home page #2 University of Rochester, Department of Physics & Astronomy

21st-century American physicists
University of Maine alumni
MIT Department of Physics alumni
Massachusetts Institute of Technology staff
University of Chicago faculty
University of Rochester faculty
Living people
1932 births
Fellows of the American Physical Society
MIT Lincoln Laboratory people